This is a timeline of the Han dynasty (206 BC–220 AD).

3rd century BC

2nd century BC

200s BC

190s BC

180s BC

170s BC

160s BC

150s BC

140s BC

130s BC

120s BC

110s BC

1st century BC

100s BC

90s BC

80s BC

70s BC

60s BC

50s BC

40s BC

30s BC

10s BC

1st century

0s

10s

20s

30s

40s

50s

60s

70s

80s

90s

2nd century

100s

110s

120s

130s

140s

150s

160s

170s

180s

190s

3rd century

Gallery

Citations

Bibliography
 (alk. paper)

 

Han